James Tilly Matthews (1770 – 10 January 1815) was a London tea broker, originally of Welsh and Huguenot descent, who was committed to Bethlem (colloquially Bedlam) in 1797 after his politically charged delusions drove him to disrupt debate in the House of Commons.
His delusions were documented in the 1810 book Illustrations of Madness, including his belief that a gang of spies were using an "air loom" to invisibly torment him at a distance. 
His is considered to be the first fully documented case of paranoid schizophrenia.

Biography

Voyage to France
In the early 1790s, concerned at the likelihood of war between Britain and France, Matthews travelled to France with the radical David Williams who was acquainted with such Girondists as Jacques Pierre Brissot and Le Brun. Williams made efforts at mediation which failed, whereupon Matthews took the lead. He gained the trust of the French government for a short time.

On 2 June 1793 the Girondists were displaced by the Jacobins and Matthews fell under suspicion for his Girondist associations and also because he was suspected of being a double agent. He was arrested and imprisoned for three years during the height of The Terror and was reportedly terrified of the guillotine, like all others. This lasted until 1796 when the French authorities concluded that he was a lunatic and released him.

Committal
Returning to London, Matthews wrote two letters to Lord Liverpool, in which he accused the Home Secretary of treason and complained about conspiracies directed against his life. After interrupting a debate in the House of Commons by shouting "Treason" at Lord Liverpool from the Public Gallery, he was arrested and held at Tothill Fields Bridewell, a secure house of correction in Tothill Fields, Westminster before being admitted to the Bethlem (Bedlam) hospital on 28 January 1797. Upon examination he declared that he had taken part in secret affairs of state (referring to his efforts in France), but had been betrayed and abandoned by William Pitt's administration.

In 1809 his family and friends petitioned for his release, on the grounds that he was no longer insane, but their petition was rejected by the Bethlem authorities. They therefore took out a suit of habeas corpus and two doctors, George Birkbeck and Henry Clutterbuck examined Matthews, declaring him sane. John Haslam, the resident apothecary at Bethlem, begged to differ and maintained that Matthews' delusions, particularly on political matters, rendered him a danger both to public figures and the general public.

Illustrations of Madness

In 1810 John Haslam produced the book Illustrations of Madness (original title: Illustrations of Madness: Exhibiting a Singular Case of Insanity, And a No Less Remarkable Difference in Medical Opinions: Developing the Nature of An Assailment, And the Manner of Working Events; with a Description of Tortures Experienced by Bomb-Bursting, Lobster-Cracking and Lengthening the Brain. Embellished with a Curious Plate). Haslam intended to settle the dispute over Matthews' sanity; his book contains verbatim accounts of Matthew's beliefs and hallucinatory experiences and is considered the original description of the symptoms of paranoid schizophrenia. The book documented the first full study of a single psychiatric patient in medical history and has become a classic in the medical literature.

The "Air Loom"
Matthews believed that a gang of criminals and spies skilled in pneumatic chemistry had taken up residence at London Wall in Moorfields (close to Bethlem) and were tormenting him by means of rays emitted by a machine called the "Air Loom" or gaseous charge generator. The torments induced by the rays included "Lobster-cracking", during which the circulation of the blood was prevented by a magnetic field; "Stomach-skinning" and "Apoplexy-working with the nutmeg grater" which involved the introduction of fluids into the skull. His persecutors bore such names as "the Middleman" (who operated the Air Loom), "the Glove Woman" and "Sir Archy" (who acted as "repeaters" or "active worriers" to enhance Matthews' torment or record the machine's activities) and their leader, a man called "Bill, or the King".

Matthews' delusions had a definite political slant: he claimed that the purpose of this gang was espionage, and that there were many other such gangs armed with Air Looms all over London, using "pneumatic practitioners" to "premagnetize" potential victims with "volatile magnetic fluid". According to Matthews, their chief targets (apart from himself) were leading government figures. By means of their "rays" they could influence ministers' thoughts and read their minds. Matthews declared that William Pitt was "not half" susceptible to these attacks and held that these gangs were responsible for the British military disasters at Buenos Aires in 1807 and Walcheren in 1809 and also for the Nore Mutiny of 1797.

In 1814 Matthews was moved to "Fox's London House", a private asylum in Hackney, where he became a popular and trusted patient. His delusions appeared to have stopped. The asylum's owner, Dr. Fox, regarded him as sane. Matthews assisted with bookkeeping and gardening until his death on 10 January 1815.

Significance of the Air Loom Gang affair
Although it is impossible to make an unequivocal diagnosis of a person long since deceased, Matthews' description of his torment by the "Air Loom Gang" reads as a classic example of paranoid persecutory delusions experienced as part of a psychotic episode. From this, it can be concluded that his disorder was most likely schizophrenia, although retrospective diagnoses should be treated with caution.

It should also be noted that while Haslam kept notes on Matthews, Matthews kept notes on Haslam and his treatment in Bethlem. This formed part of the evidence looked at by the House of Commons 'Committee On the Better Regulation of Madhouses in England' in 1815, the findings of which led to Haslam's dismissal and reform of the treatment of patients in the Bethlem Hospital.

Matthews was also important in the history of psychiatry for more practical reasons. During his involuntary confinement he took part in a public competition to design plans for the rebuilding of Bethlem hospital. Bethlem's governors thought so well of the 46 pages of designs submitted by Matthews that they paid him £50  and the drawings finally used to build the new hospital show some features proposed by Matthews.

Fictional representations
Haslam's Key, a play written by journalist Danny O'Brien and performed at the Edinburgh Fringe in 1993, imagined Matthews as a forerunner of modern science fiction authors. The titular "key" was a wooden spoon-like device invented by John Haslam, the documenter of Matthew's delusions, which was used to force-feed Bedlam patients.
Richard Hayden's novel The Influencing Engine (1996) is a fantasy loosely based on aspects of Matthews' life.
In 2002, the British artist Rod Dickinson built a re-creation of the air loom from Matthews' original plans.
Greg Hollingshead's novel Bedlam (2004) concerns the changing relationship between John Haslam and Matthews and is narrated in first-person from the perspective of Haslam, Matthews, and Matthews' wife.
The CSI episode "Lab Rats" (2007), Grissom uses Matthews' condition as an analogy in describing The Miniature Killer, a serial killer obsessed with bleach.
Robert Rankin's 2007 novel, The Da-da-de-da-da Code, features a group of villains known as the Air Loom Gang, as well as a doctor named Doctor Archy, a pub called "The Middle Man" and a beer called "King Billy".
 The first album from Aberystwyth band The Lowland Hundred features a song called "The Air Loom", which references the affair.
 The game Amnesia: A Machine for Pigs from 2013 makes several references to both James Tilly Matthews, the Air Loom and Bedlam.
 Avant-garde black metal band Denizens released a 2013 EP titled On The Origins of the Influencing Machine directly referencing Matthews.

See also
 Influencing Machine
 Mind control
 Persecutory delusion

References

Further reading
 Jonathan Andrews, "Haslam, John (bap. 1764, d. 1844)", Oxford Dictionary of National Biography, Oxford University Press, 2004.
  Carpenter, P.K., "Descriptions of Schizophrenia in the Psychiatry of Georgian Britain: John Haslam and James Tilly Matthews", Comprehensive Psychiatry, 30 (4), 332–338. 1989.
 Gere, C., "The technologies and politics of delusion: an interview with artist Rod Dickinson", Studies in History and Philosophy of Science Part C: Studies in History and Philosophy of Biological and Biomedical Sciences, Vol.35, No.2, (June 2004), pp. 333–349.
 Haslam, J., Illustrations of Madness: Exhibiting a Singular Case of Insanity, and No Less Remarkable Difference of Medical Opinion: Developing the Nature of An Assailment, and the Manner of Working Events; with a Description of the Tortures Experienced by Bomb-Bursting, Lobster-Cracking, and Lengthening the Brain, etc., G. Hayden, (London), 1810.
 Howard, R., "James Tilly Matthews in London and Paris 1793: His First Peace Mission — in His Own Words", History of Psychiatry, Vol.2, No.5, (March 1991), pp. 53–69.
 Howard, R., "Useful or useless architecture? A dimension of the relationship between the Georgian schizophrenic James Tilly Matthews and his doctor, John Haslam", Psychiatric Bulletin, Vol.14, No.10, (October 1990), pp. 620–622.
 Jay, M., The Air Loom Gang, Bantam Press, (London), 2003.
 Jay, M., "The Shadow of the Air Loom", Fortean Times, No.220, (March 2007), pp. 52–54.
 Matthews, J.T., Useful Architecture, S. Bass, (London), 1812.
 Pilkington, M., "The Air Loom", Fortean Times, No.170, (May 2003), pp. 40–43.
 Porter, R., "Reason, Madness, and the French Revolution", Studies in Eighteenth Century Culture, Vol.20, (1991), pp. 55–79.
 Suzuki, A., "My own private England – the madness of James Tilly Matthews and of his times", History of Psychiatry, (December 2005), Vo.16, No.4, pp. 497–502.
 Trotter, David. Paranoid Modernism: Literary Experiment, Psychosis, and the Professionalization of English Society, Oxford University Press, (Oxford), 2001.
 Williams, D.,  "The Missions of David Williams and James Tilly Matthews to England (1793)", The English Historical Review, Vol.53, No.212, (October 1938), pp. 651–668.

1770 births
1815 deaths
English businesspeople
History of mental health in the United Kingdom
People with schizophrenia